Afipia  is a genus of bacteria in the Nitrobacteraceae family.

Phylogeny
The currently accepted taxonomy is based on the List of Prokaryotic names with Standing in Nomenclature (LPSN). The phylogeny is based on whole-genome analysis.

References

Nitrobacteraceae
Bacteria genera